Batrachostomus is a genus of frogmouths. The generic name is a direct translation from the Greek for 'frogmouth'; / 'frog' and / 'mouth'.

References

 
Bird genera